is a Japanese manga series written and illustrated by Meguru Ueno. It was serialized in Kodansha's seinen manga magazine Weekly Young Magazine from July 2019 to March 2021. It is licensed in North America for English release by Seven Seas Entertainment.

Publication
Does a Hot Elf Live Next Door to You, written and illustrated by Meguru Ueno, was serialized in Kodansha's seinen manga magazine Weekly Young Magazine from July 13, 2019 to March 22, 2021. Kodansha collected its chapters in five tankōbon volumes, released from January 6, 2020 to June 4, 2021.

In North America, Seven Seas Entertainment announced the English release of the series in both print and digital format starting in August 2021.

Volume list

See also
 My First Girlfriend Is a Gal, another manga series by the same author
 Gal-sen, another manga series by the same author

References

External links
 

Fantasy anime and manga
Harem anime and manga
Kodansha manga
Romantic comedy anime and manga
Seinen manga
Seven Seas Entertainment titles